Redlands–University station is a terminal station on the Arrow rail line that serves the University of Redlands. The station was built as part of the Arrow service and opened on October 24, 2022.

History
It is located alongside East Park Avenue at its intersection with Norh University Street on the southwest corner of the University of Redlands campus. Station construction was largely completed in 2021, and opened for revenue service with the system on October 24, 2022. The station has 100 park and ride spaces available for customers.

East of the station, the rail right of way continues as a multi-use recreation path called the Orange Blossom Trail. , the University was planning to construct a transit village at the site via a public–private partnership.

Service

References

External links 

Railway stations in the United States opened in 2022
Buildings and structures in Redlands, California
Redlands, California
University of Redlands
Railway stations in California at university and college campuses
Arrow stations